Robert Cowper or Robert Cooper (c. 1465–1539/40) was an English composer. He studied music at the University of Cambridge and sang as a lay-clerk there in the Choir of King's College. He was later appointed master of the choristers of the household chapel of Lady Margaret Beaufort.

He composed both sacred and secular music, including masses, motets and madrigals. The Gyffard partbooks contain a four part setting of Hodie composed by Cowper with John Taverner and Thomas Tallis.

References

Notes

External links

English classical composers
Renaissance composers
Sacred music composers
16th-century English musicians
16th-century English composers
Classical composers of church music
English male classical composers